USS Worcester has been the name of three ships in the United States Navy.

  a bark-rigged screw steam sloop-of-war that was launched in 1866.
  was the lead ship of the s.

United States Navy ship names